Xylometazoline, also spelled xylomethazoline, is a medication used to reduce symptoms of nasal congestion, allergic rhinitis, and sinusitis. Use is not recommended for more than seven days. Use is also not recommended in those less than three months of age and some say not less than 6 years of age. It is used directly in the nose as a spray or drops.

Side effects include trouble sleeping, irritation of the nose, nausea, nosebleed (3%), period pain (10%) and headache (3%). Long term use (> 10 days) is not recommended due to a rhinitis medicamentosa when stopped. Use is not recommended during pregnancy. Xylometazoline is in the decongestant and alpha-adrenergic agonist families of medication.

Xylometazoline was patented in 1956 and came into medical use in 1959. It is on the World Health Organization's List of Essential Medicines. Xylometazoline is available as a generic medication.

Mechanism of action
The drug works by stimulating adrenergic receptors on the lamina propria of blood vessels in the nose. The decongestant effect is due to constriction of large veins in the nose which swell up during the inflammation of any infection or allergy of the nose. The smaller arteries are also constricted and this causes the colour of the nasal epithelium to be visibly paler after dosage.

Xylometazoline is an imidazole derivative which is designed to mimic the molecular shape of adrenaline. It binds to α1 and α2 adrenergic receptors in the nasal mucosa. Due to its sympathomimetic effects, it should not be used by people with high blood pressure, or other heart problems.

Extended usage of xylometazoline can result in decreased effectiveness or a buildup of tolerance against the drug. The number of receptors decreases, and when the administration of the drug is ceased, chronic congestion can occur; this is called rhinitis medicamentosa, commonly referred to as rebound congestion. Moreover, long-term overdosing can cause degenerative changes in nasal mucous membranes that pose another health problem.

Society and culture

Brand names
The most common name for over-the-counter products containing xylometazoline internationally is "Otrivin" (used in Australia, Canada, Estonia, Greece, Hungary, India, Israel, Jordan, Netherlands, New Zealand, Norway, Poland, South Africa, Sweden, Vietnam, Hong Kong), "Otrivine" (United Kingdom, Ireland, Turkey), or "Otriven" (Germany). A product marketed as "Otrivin Oxy" contains oxymetazoline instead of xylometazoline.

Other product names used include Antazol (Square, in Bangladesh), Xylomet (Opsonin, Bangladesh), Cirovin, Klarigen (in Denmark), Nasolin, Neo-Rinoleina, Novorin, Olynth, Otrinoz, Galazolin (Russia, Ukraine, Belarus), Nasomist-X, Otrix, Rhinoset, Zenfresh, Naphthyzinium, Xymelyn (in Latvia), Sinutab Nasal Spray, Snup akut, Sudafed, Xylo-COMOD, Xylolin (in UAE), Xylovit, Olynth (in Serbia and Slovakia), Meralys (in Croatia) Xynosine (in Pakistan, Afghanistan, Kyrgyzstan and Kazakhstan), Xymelin, Zymelin, Xylostar, Xylorin (in Poland), Nasobol, Xylo Mepha and others (Switzerland), Decozal (in Jordan), Nasic, Orinox (Romania), Narhimed (Italy), and nasa Rhinathiol (Belgium).

As of 2021, no consumer products containing xylometazoline are marketed in the United States, however imported products containing xylometazoline are available online.

Formulations
The standard adult solution strength is 0.1% w/v xylometazoline (or 1 mg per 1 mL solution), and the dose for children under 12 is usually 0.05% (0.5 mg/mL).

See also
 Oxymetazoline

References

External links
 

Alpha-1 adrenergic receptor agonists
Alpha-2 adrenergic receptor agonists
Imidazolines
Tert-butyl compounds
Topical decongestants
Vasoconstrictors
World Health Organization essential medicines
Wikipedia medicine articles ready to translate